Chuen-Gun "C.G." Lee (이천군) (born October 26, 1980 in Seoul, South Korea) is a South Korean ice dancer who competed internationally for the United States. He competed for South Korea with Yang Tae-hwa. The two competed together from 1996 to 2002, placing 24th at the 2002 Winter Olympics. They were the first ice dancers from South Korea to compete in the Olympics.

Lee and Yang trained in the United States. Following that partnership, Lee partnered with American Kate Slattery, with whom he competed internationally for the United States. They were coached by Gennady Karponosov, Natalia Linichuk, and Vitaly Popkov. They announced their split on March 28, 2007. Lee now works as a wonderful coach, with both: couples competing at Nationals, and adult learners.

Competitive highlights

For the United States
(with Kate Slattery for the United States)

 WD = Withdrew

For South Korea
(with Yang for South Korea)

References

External links
 
 
 IceDance.com: Slattery & Lee

1980 births
Living people
South Korean male ice dancers
American male ice dancers
Olympic figure skaters of South Korea
Figure skaters at the 2002 Winter Olympics
Figure skaters from Seoul
Asian Games medalists in figure skating
Figure skaters at the 1999 Asian Winter Games
Medalists at the 1999 Asian Winter Games
Asian Games bronze medalists for South Korea
Competitors at the 2001 Winter Universiade